Michalakis Antoniou Triantafyllides (1927–2005) was a Cypriot jurist who served as president of the Supreme Court of Cyprus (1971–1988) and Attorney General of Cyprus (1988–1995). He also served on the European Commission of Human Rights from  1963 to 1989.

References

1927 births
2005 deaths
People from Nicosia
Cypriot judges of international courts and tribunals
Attorneys-General of Cyprus
Supreme Court of Cyprus judges
Greek Cypriot people
Members of the European Commission of Human Rights